Rexea is a genus of snake mackerels found in the Indian and Pacific oceans. It feeds on fishes, crustaceans and cephalopods.

Species
There are currently seven recognized species in this genus:
 Rexea alisae C. D. Roberts & A. L. Stewart, 1997
 Rexea antefurcata Parin, 1989 (Long-finned escolar)
 Rexea bengalensis (Alcock, 1894) (Bengal escolar)
 Rexea brevilineata Parin, 1989 (Short-lined escolar)
 Rexea nakamurai Parin, 1989 (Nakamura's escolar)
 Rexea prometheoides (Bleeker, 1856) (Royal escolar)
 Rexea solandri (G. Cuvier, 1832) (Silver gemfish)

References

Gempylidae